Tiv is a South Korean female illustrator and manga artist born in Seoul. She is a Korea University graduate. Starting in 2005, she became a freelancer illustrator and debuted as manga artist with Annyeong!. In 2010, she moved her main activities to Japan and now lives at Saitama Prefecture.

Works

Manga
Annyeong! -We are Peanuts- (2007-2009, Futabasha)
Bokura wa Minna Ikiteiru! (2010-2012, Ichijinsha)
Heaven's Memo Pad - Hikaru Sugii (2010-2012, Dengeki Daioh)
Komori Quintet! - Hikaru Sugii (2013-2015, Dengeki Daioh)
Masamune-kun's Revenge - Hazuki Takeoka (2012-2019, Comic Rex)
School! Scoop? (2012-2013, SD&GO!)

Light novels
Ao Haru! - Shun Uchida (2012, MF Bunko J)
Azukete! Jikan Ginkō-cho - Nobuki Itō (2009, Sneaker Bunko)
Hiru mo Yoru mo, Ryōte ni Akujo-cho - Iko Torimura (2011, Gagaga Bunko)
Ima, N Kaime no Kanojo - Garu Kobayashi (2016, Fujimi Shobo)
Inutsuki-san - Yōsuke Karabe (2009, Square Enix)
Manga no Kami-sama - Ikko Sono (2015–present, Dengeki Bunko)
Masamune-kun's Revenge Novel - Hazuki Takeoka (2013 & 2016, Ichijinsha Bunko)
Shitashii Kimi to no Mishiranu Kioku - Yu Kudo (2017, Famitsu Bunko)
Shōjo Kaidan - Chiya Fujino (2008, Bungei Shunjū)
Shugei Onna - Ritsuko Nosaka (2015, TO Books)
Yoshi Yume ga Kuru! - Taeko Higashi (2013-2015, Aoi Tori Bunko)

Character designs
Idol Incidents
Two Car

Others
Eromanga Sensei (Sagiri's illustrations; anime only)

References

External links 

Official website 

1981 births
Living people
South Korean illustrators